This article contains information about the literary events and publications of 2011.

Events
June 7 – Ransom Riggs publishes his young-adult novel Miss Peregrine's Home for Peculiar Children, which pins its narrative around a series of earlier private photographs he had collected. It remains top of The New York Times Children's Chapter Books list for 45 weeks and founds a series of five novels.
July – J. K. Rowling ends her relationship with her long-standing agent Christopher Little and joins his rival, Neil Blair.
September 24 – The first 100 Thousand Poets for Change Day takes place, the organization having been founded by Michael Rothenberg and Terri Carrion in March.
November 12 – The Ahmet Hamdi Tanpınar Literature Museum Library opens in Istanbul, Turkey.

New books

Fiction
Chris Adrian – The Great Night
David Almond – The True Tale of the Monster Billy Dean
Charlie Jane Anders – Six Months, Three Days
Kevin Barry – City of Bohane
Giannina Braschi – United States of Banana
T. C. Boyle – When the Killing's Done
Geraldine Brooks – Caleb's Crossing
Bonnie Jo Campbell – Once Upon a River
Kate Christensen – The Astral: A Novel
Patrick deWitt – The Sisters Brothers
E. L. Doctorow – All the Time in the World
Steve Earle – I'll Never Get Out of This World Alive
Esi Edugyan – Half-Blood Blues
Jeffrey Eugenides – The Marriage Plot
Jonathan Evison – West of Here
Robb Forman Dew – Being Polite to Hitler
Charles Frazier – Nightwoods
James Frey – The Final Testament of the Holy Bible
Roxane Gay – Ayiti (short stories)
Abdulrazak Gurnah – The Last Gift
Benjamin Hale – The Evolution of Bruno Littlemore
Hallgrímur Helgason – Konan við 1000° (The Woman at 1000°)
Ron Hansen – A Wild Surge of Guilty Passion
Chad Harbach – The Art of Fielding
Philip Hensher – King of the Badgers
Alan Hollinghurst – The Stranger's Child
E. L. James – Fifty Shades of Grey
Mat Johnson – Pym
Stephen Kelman – Pigeon English
Jeanine Leane – Purple Threads
Ben Lerner – Leaving the Atocha Station
Merethe Lindstrøm – Days in the History of Silence (Dager i stillhetens historie)
Javier Marías – Los enamoramientos (The Infatuations)
Andrew Miller – Pure
Haruki Murakami (村上 春樹) – 1Q84
Téa Obreht – The Tiger's Wife
Daniel Olivas – The Book of Want
Michael Ondaatje – The Cat's Table
Ann Patchett – State of Wonder
Chuck Palahniuk – Damned
Tom Perrotta – The Leftovers
Arthur Phillips – The Tragedy of Arthur
Nina Revoyr – Wingshooters
Rodrigo Rey Rosa – Severina (novella)
Karen Russell – Swamplandia!
Stig Sæterbakken – Through the Night (Gjennom natten)
John Sayles – A Moment in the Sun
Faruk Šehić – Knjiga o Uni (Quiet Flows the Una)
Dana Spiotta – Stone Arabia
Colm Tóibín – The Empty Family
Zlatko Topčić – The Final Word
Donald Trump (with Jeffrey Robinson) – Trump Tower
Juan Gabriel Vásquez – The Sound of Things Falling (El ruido de las cosas al caer)
David Foster Wallace – The Pale King
Daniel Woodrell – The Outlaw Album

Children and young people
Chris Van Allsburg
Queen of the Falls
The Chronicles of Harris Burdick: Fourteen Amazing Authors Tell the Tales
David Almond – The True Tale of the Monster Billy Dean
Kelley Armstrong – The Gathering
K. A. Applegate – Re-release of Animorphs books
The Invasion
The Visitor
Paula Bossio – El Lapiz (The Pencil, 2016) 
Carmen Agra Deedy (with Randall Wright) – The Cheshire Cheese Cat: A Dickens of a Tale
Cornelia Funke – Ghost Knight
Andy Griffiths – The 13-Storey Treehouse (first in the Treehouse series of seven books)
Anthony Horowitz – Scorpia Rising
Jon Klassen – I Want My Hat Back
Gordon Korman, Peter Lerangis, Rick Riordan, and Jude Watson – Vespers Rising
Maxine Kumin – Oh, Harry!
Derek Landy – Skulduggery Pleasant: Kingdom of the Wicked
Patricia McKissack (with Leo and Diane Dillon) – Never Forgotten
Courtney Allison Moulton – Angelfire
Brandon Mull – Beyonders: A World Without Heroes
Christopher Paolini – Inheritance
Liz Pichon – The Brilliant World of Tom Gates
Jerry Pinkney (adaptation) – Twinkle, Twinkle, Little Star
Catherine Rayner – Solomon Crocodile
Rick Riordan
The Throne of Fire
The Son of Neptune
Douglas Wood – Franklin and Winston: A Christmas That Changed the World

Poetry
See 2011 in poetry.
Rae Armantrout – Money Shot (February)
Billy Collins – Horoscopes for the Dead (April)
Mehr Lal Soni Zia Fatehabadi – Meri Tasveer (Urdu, My Portrait)
Susan Howe – That This (February)
Alice Notley – Culture of One (March)
Sarah Palin (edited by Michael Solomon) – I Hope Like Heck (June 21)
Michael Palmer – Thread (May)
Lee Wardlaw – Won Ton: A Cat Tale Told in Haiku

Drama
Richard Bean – One Man, Two Guvnors (adaptation)
Alecky Blythe – London Road (musical verbatim theatre)
Nick Dear – Frankenstein
Vivienne Franzmann – Mogadishu
Rodrigo García – Golgota Picnic
Stephen Adly Guirgis – The Motherfucker with the Hat
Sam Holcroft – Edgar and Annabel
Stephen Karam – Sons of the Prophet
Andrew Motion – Incoming
Various authors – Sixty-Six Books

Science fiction and fantasy
Joe Abercrombie – The Heroes
Daniel Abraham
The Dragon's Path
Leviathan Wakes (writing as James S. A. Corey, with Ty Franck)
Ann Aguirre – Aftermath
Greg Bear – Halo: Cryptum
Lauren Beukes – Zoo City
M. M. Buckner – The Gravity Pilot
Robert Buettner – Undercurrents
Jack Campbell – The Lost Frontier: Beyond the Frontier: Dreadnought
Orson Scott Card – The Lost Gate
Ernest Cline – Ready Player One
Michael Crichton & Richard Preston – Micro
Ian Douglas – Center of Gravity
David Anthony Durham – The Sacred Band
Greg Egan – The Clockwork Rocket
William Giraldi – Busy Monsters
Michael Grant — Plague
Mira Grant – Deadline
Lev Grossman – The Magician King
Stephen Hunt – The Rise of the Iron Moon
N. K. Jemisin – The Kingdom of Gods
Stephen King — 11/22/63
Sharon Lee & Steve Miller – Ghost Ship
Pittacus Lore — The Power of Six
Richard Matheson – Other Kingdoms
George R. R. Martin – A Dance with Dragons
Jack McDevitt – Firebird
China Miéville – Embassytown
Andrew Miller – Pure
Karen Miller – A Blight of Mages
Richard K. Morgan – The Cold Commands
Joseph Nassise – Eyes to See
Terry Pratchett – Snuff
Cherie Priest – Ganymede
Hannu Rajaniemi – The Quantum Thief
Brian Ruckley – The Edinburgh Dead
Brandon Sanderson – The Alloy of Law
John Scalzi – Fuzzy Nation
Dan Simmons – Flashback
Neal Stephenson – Reamde
Charles Stross – Rule 34
Michael Swanwick – Dancing with Bears
Catherynne M. Valente – Deathless
Vernor Vinge – The Children of the Sky
Jo Walton – Among Others
David Weber – How Firm a Foundation
Robert Charles Wilson – Vortex
Daniel Wilson – Robopocalypse
Gene Wolfe – Home Fires

Crime and Thrillers
Jeff Abbott – Adrenaline
Ace Atkins – The Ranger
Kate Atkinson – Started Early, Took My Dog
Steve Berry – The Jefferson Key
James Lee Burke – Feast Day of Fools
Lee Child – The Affair
Edward Conlon – Red on Red
Michael Connelly – The Fifth Witness
John Connolly – The Burning Soul
Chris Culver – The Abbey
Jeffery Deaver – Carte Blanche
Ted Dekker and Tosca Lee – Forbidden
Ted Dekker – The Priest's Graveyard
Ranj Dhaliwal – Daaku: The Gangster's Life
Sue Grafton – V is for Vengeance
John Grisham – The Litigators
Morag Joss – Among the Missing
Stuart M. Kaminsky – A Whisper to the Living
Joe R. Lansdale
Hyenas: a Hap and Leonard Novella
Devil Red
Henning Mankell – The Troubled Man
Jo Nesbø – The Snowman
T. Jefferson Parker – The Border Lords
George Pelecanos – The Cut
Ralph Peters – The Officers' Club
James Rollins – The Devil's Colony
John Sandford – Buried Prey
Marcus Sakey – The Two Deaths of Daniel Hayes
Bernard J. Schaffer – Whitechapel: The Final Stand of Sherlock Holmes
Duane Swierczynski – Fun and Games
Guillermo del Toro and Chuck Hogan – The Night Eternal
Nicolaas Vergunst – Knot of Stone
Ferdinand von Schirach – Der Fall Collini (The Collini Case)
S. J. Watson – Before I Go to Sleep

Non-fiction
Peter Bergen – The Longest War: The Enduring Conflict between America and Al-Qaeda
Abhinav Bindra – A Shot at History: My Obsessive Journey to Olympic Gold
Mark Bowden – Worm: The First Digital World War
Frank Brady – Endgame: The Spectacular Rise and Fall of Bobby Fischer
Michael Bronski – A Queer History of the United States
David Brooks – The Social Animal
Brian Christian – The Most Human Human
Wade Davis – Into the Silence: The Great War, Mallory and the Conquest of Everest
Richard Dawkins – The Magic of Reality: How We Know What's Really True
Douglas Edwards – I'm Feeling Lucky
T. J. English – The Savage City: Race, Murder and a Generation on the Edge
Ulrich Eberl – Life in 2050
Tina Fey – Bossypants
John M. Findlay and Bruce Hevly - Atomic Frontier Days: Hanford and the American West
Joshua Foer – Moonwalking with Einstein
James Gleick – The Information: A History, a Theory, a Flood
Brian Greene – The Hidden Reality
Michael Gross – Unreal Estate: Money, Ambition, and the Lust for Land in Los Angeles
Yuval Noah Harari – קיצור תולדות האנושות (Ḳitsur toldot ha-enoshut, Sapiens: A Brief History of Humankind)
Matthew Hollis – Now All Roads Lead to France
Louis Hyman – Debtor Nation
Zlatan Ibrahimović and David Lagercrantz – I Am Zlatan Ibrahimović (Jag är Zlatan Ibrahimović)
Daniel Kahneman – Thinking, Fast and Slow
David King – Death in the City of Light: The Serial Killer of Nazi-Occupied Paris
Joshua Knelman – Hot Art
Lawrence M. Krauss – Quantum Man: Richard Feynman's Life in Science
B. B. Lal – Piecing Together – Memoirs of an Archaeologist
Erik Larson – In the Garden of Beasts: Love, Terror, and an American Family in Hitler's Berlin
Joseph Lelyveld – Great Soul: Mahatma Gandhi and His Struggle With India
Steven Levy – In The Plex: How Google Thinks, Works, and Shapes Our Lives
Charles C. Mann – 1493: Uncovering the New World Columbus Created
Rajiv Malhotra
Being Different
Breaking India
David McCullough – The Greater Journey
Ben Mezrich – Sex on the Moon
Scott Miller – The President and the Assassin
Errol Morris – Believing is Seeing
Grant Morrison – Supergods
Joyce Carol Oates – A Widow's Story
Patton Oswalt – Zombie, Spaceship, Wasteland
Dana Priest – Top Secret America
Annie Proulx – Bird Cloud: A Memoir
Janet Reitman – Inside Scientology: The Story of America's Most Secretive Religion
Sylvain Tesson – The Consolations of the Forest
Sarah Vowell – Unfamiliar Fishes
Matt Welch and Nick Gillespie – The Declaration of Independents
Jeanette Winterson – Why Be Happy When You Could Be Normal?
Daniel Yergin – The Quest
Mitchell Zuckoff – Lost in Shangri-La

Deaths
January 2 – Robert Trumble, Australian writer (born 1919)
January 4
Eva Strittmatter, German author and poet (born 1930)
Dick King-Smith English children's writer (born 1922)
January 10 – Joe Gores, American novelist and screenwriter (born 1931)
January 11 – Marcel Trudel, Canadian historian and author (born 1917)
January 14 – Sun Axelsson, Swedish novelist (born 1935)
January 15 – Romulus Linney, American playwright (born 1930)
January 16 – R. F. Langley, English poet and diarist (born 1938)
January 17 – Jean Dutourd, French novelist (born 1920)
January 19 – Wilfrid Sheed, English-born American novelist and essayist (born 1930)
January 20
F. A. Nettelbeck, American poet (born 1950)
Reynolds Price, American author (born 1933)
January 22 – Park Wan-suh, South Korean novelist (born 1931)
January 23 – Novica Tadić, Serbian poet (born 1949)
January 24 – Anna Yablonskaya, Ukrainian playwright and poet (born 1981)
January 25 – Vincent Cronin, English writer (born 1924)
January 29
Loreen Rice Lucas, Canadian author (born 1914)
Hemayel Martina, Curaçaon poet (born 1990)
January 30 – Hisaye Yamamoto, Japanese American author (born 1921)
February 2 – Eric Nicol, Canadian author (born 1919)
February 3 – Édouard Glissant, Martinique poet and critic writing in French (born 1928)
February 5
Charles E. Silberman, American author (born 1925)
Martin Quigley Jr., American author and publisher (born 1917)
Brian Jacques, English children's writer (born 1939)
February 9 – David Sánchez Juliao, Colombian author and diplomat (born 1945)
February 13 – Oakley Hall III, American playwright (born 1950)
February 15 – Judith Binney, New Zealand author (born 1940)
February 16
Justinas Marcinkevičius, Lithuanian poet and playwright (born 1930)
Hans Joachim Alpers, German science fiction author (born 1943)
February 17
Perry Moore, American author (born 1971)
Vivien Noakes, English biographer and critic (born 1937)
James McLure, American playwright (born 1951)
February 18 – Victor Martinez, US poet and novelist (born 1954)
February 19 – Max Wilk, American playwright, screenwriter and author (born 1920)
February 22 – Ion Hobana, Romanian science fiction author (born 1931)
February 25
Manny Fried, American playwright and actor (born 1913)
Aminath Faiza, Maldivian poet and writer in the Dhivehi language (born 1924)
February 26 – Arnošt Lustig, Czech author (born 1926)
February 28 – Netiva Ben-Yehuda, Israeli author (born 1928)
March 2 – Thor Vilhjálmsson, Icelandic author (born 1925)
March 3 – May Cutler, Canadian author and publisher (born 1923)
March 5 – Alberto Granado, Argentine-born Cuban biochemist and writer (born 1922)
March 8
Iraj Afshar, Iranian bibliographer and historian (born 1925)
Steven Kroll, American children's author (born 1941)
March 9 – Doris Burn, American children's author and illustrator (born 1923)
March 13 – Leo Steinberg, American art historian and critic (born 1920)
March 14 – Giora Leshem, Israeli poet and publisher (born 1940)
March 19 – Raymond Garlick, English-born Welsh poet and editor (born 1926)
March 26 – Diana Wynne Jones, English children's fantasy novelist (born 1934)
March 27 – H. R. F. Keating, English crime novelist (born 1926)
April 2 – Paul Violi, American poet (born 1944)
April 3 – Ulli Beier, German writer, editor and scholar (born 1922)
April 4 – Craig Thomas, Welsh novelist (born 1942)
April 6 – Thøger Birkeland, Danish children's writer (born 1922)
April 10 – Stephen Watson, South African writer and critic in English (born 1954)
April 12 – Sachin Bhowmick, Indian screenwriter (born 1930)
April 14
Rosihan Anwar, Indonesian journalist (born 1922)
Patrick Cullinan, South African poet and biographer (born 1933)
April 16 – William A. Rusher, American columnist and publisher (born 1923)
April 17 – Bob Block, English comedy writer (born 1921)
April 19 – Anne Blonstein, English poet (born 1958)
April 20 – Madelyn Pugh, American screenwriter (born 1921)
April 21 – W. J. Gruffydd (Elerydd), Welsh-language poet (born 1916)
April 25 – Gonzalo Rojas, Chilean poet (born 1917)
April 29
Abdul Hameed, Pakistani novelist (born 1928)
Joanna Russ, American science fiction author (born 1937)
April 30
Richard Holmes, English military historian (born 1946)
Ernesto Sabato, Argentine writer (born 1911)
May 4 – Frans Sammut, Maltese writer (born 1945)
May 5 – Arthur Laurents, American playwright, librettist and screenwriter (born 1917)
May 9 – Newton Thornburg, American novelist (born 1929)
May 10 – Patrick Galvin, Irish poet and dramatist (born 1927)
May 11 – Reach Sambath, Cambodian journalist (born 1964)
May 13
Pam Gems, English playwright (born 1925)
Badal Sarkar, Indian dramatist (born 1925)
May 14 – Birgitta Trotzig, Swedish novelist and poet (born 1929)
May 15 – Martin Woodhouse, English novelist, screenwriter and inventor (born 1932)
May 19 – William Kloefkorn, American poet (born 1932)
May 21 – Pádraig Kennelly, Irish journalist, publisher and editor (born 1938)
May 22 – Chidananda Dasgupta, Indian film critic (born 1921)
May 23 – Roberto Sosa, Honduran poet (heart attack, born 1930)
May 25
Leonora Carrington, British-born Mexican painter and novelist (born 1917)
Edwin Honig, American poet and translator (born 1919)
Yannis Varveris, Greek poet, critic and translator (born 1955)
May 30 – Marek Siemek, Polish philosopher and historian of philosophy (born 1942)
June 4 – Curth Flatow, German dramatist and screenwriter (born 1920)
June 7 – Jorge Semprún, Spanish writer and politician (born 1923)
June 10 – Sir Patrick Leigh Fermor, English travel writer and novelist, (born 1915)
June 13 – Burt Styler, American screenwriter (born 1925)
June 18 – Cheryl B, American poet and spoken word artist (born 1972)
June 21 – Robert Kroetsch, Canadian novelist and poet (car crash, born 1927)
June 22 – Zbyněk Zeman, Czech historian (born 1928)
June 29 – K. D. Sethna, Indian poet, writer and cultural critic (born 1904)
July 7 – Olav Versto, Norwegian journalist and editor (drowning, born 1950)
July 3 – Iain Blair (Emma Blair), Scottish romance novelist (born 1942)
July 11 – Henry Carlisle, American translator, novelist and activist (born 1926)
July 16 – Geraint Bowen, Welsh poet (born 1915)
July 18 – Georgess McHargue, American author and poet (born 1941)
July 20 – Blaize Clement, American mystery writer and psychologist (born 1932)
July 22 – Ifti Nasim, Pakistani-born American poet and radio host (born 1946)
July 27 – Agota Kristof, Hungarian novelist writing in French (born 1935)
July 28 – Ahmed Omaid Khpalwak, Afghan journalist (killed in explosion, born c. 1958)
July 30 – Pêr Denez, French Breton linguist and writer (born 1921)
July 31 – Eliseo Alberto, Cuban-born Mexican novelist, essayist and journalist (born 1951)
August 1 – Stan Barstow, English novelist (born 1928)
August 3
Simona Monyová, Czech novelist (murdered, born 1967)
William Sleator, American science-fiction writer (born 1945)
August 10 – Selwyn Griffith, Welsh poet (born 1928)
August 15 – Michael Legat, English author and publisher (born 1923)
August 17 – Michel Mohrt, French writer (born 1914)
August 26 – Susan Fromberg Schaeffer, American novelist (born 1940)
August 27 – N. F. Simpson, English dramatist (born 1919)
September 9
Herbert Lomas, English poet (born 1924)
Khairy Shalaby, Egyptian novelist and dramatist (born 1938)
September 14 – Frank Parkin, Welsh sociologist and novelist (born 1931)
September 22
Cengiz Dağcı, Crimean Tatar novelist and poet writing in Turkish (born 1919)
Margaret Ogola, Kenyan novelist (born 1958)
September 23 – José Miguel Varas, Chilean writer (born 1928)
September 26 – David Zelag Goodman, American screenwriter (born 1930)
September 27
David Croft, English television writer and producer (born 1922)
Sara Douglass, Australian fantasy author (ovarian cancer, born 1957)
September 29 – Hella Haasse, Dutch novelist (born 1918)
October 4 – Vittorio Curtoni, Italian science fiction writer and translator (born 1949)
October 10 – Uno Röndahl, Swedish writer (born 1924)
October 11 – Ewald Osers, Czech translator and poet (born 1917)
October 12 – Lowell H. Harrison, American historian (born 1922)
October 15 – Earl McRae, Canadian journalist (born 1942)
October 18
Paul Everac, Romanian writer (born 1924)
Friedrich Kittler, German literary scholar and media theorist (born 1943)
October 19
Kakkanadan, Indian Malayalam writer (born 1935)
Bohdan Osadchuk, Ukrainian historian and journalist (born 1920)
October 21
Hikmet Bilâ, Turkish journalist and author (lung cancer, born 1954)
Tone Pavček, Slovenian author and translator (born 1928)
October 23
Florence Parry Heide, American children's author (born 1919)
Bogdan Zakrzewski, Polish historian and researcher of Polish literature (born 1916)
October 24 – Morio Kita (北 杜夫), Japanese novelist, essayist and psychiatrist (born 1927)
November 3
H. G. Francis, German science fiction author (born 1936)
Morris Philipson, American novelist and publisher (born 1926)
November 21
Arie van Deursen, Dutch historian (born 1931)
Theodore Enslin, American poet (born 1925)
Anne McCaffrey, American fantasy writer (born 1926)
November 25 – Leonid Borodin, Russian novelist, journalist and Soviet dissident, (born 1938) (Russian)
November 26 – Rashid Karim, Bangladeshi novelist (born 1925)
November 30
Ana Daniel, Portuguese poet (born 1928)
Partap Sharma, Indian playwright (born 1939)
December 15 – Christopher Hitchens, English journalist and commentator (esophageal cancer, born 1949)
December 20 – Barry Reckord, Jamaican playwright (born 1926)
December 23 – Tripuraneni Maharadhi, Indian screenwriter (born 1930)
December 27 – Thinley Norbu, Tibetan Buddhist writer and teacher (born 1931)
December 30 – Eleanor Ross Taylor, American poet (born 1920)
December 31
Celia Dale, English fiction writer and book reviewer (born 1912
Penny Jordan, English romantic novelist (born 1946)

Awards

Nobel Prize in Literature: Tomas Tranströmer

Australia
Miles Franklin Award: Kim Scott, That Deadman Dance

Canada
Amazon.ca First Novel Award: David Bezmozgis, The Free World
Edna Staebler Award for Creative Non-Fiction: Helen Waldstein Wilkes, Letters from the Lost
Dayne Ogilvie Prize: Main award, Farzana Doctor; honours of distinction, Dani Couture, Matthew J. Trafford.
Governor General's Awards: Multiple categories; see 2011 Governor General's Awards.
Scotiabank Giller Prize: Esi Edugyan, Half-Blood Blues
Rogers Writers' Trust Fiction Prize: Patrick deWitt, The Sisters Brothers
Hilary Weston Writers' Trust Prize for Nonfiction: Charles Foran, Mordecai: The Life and Times
Writers' Trust Engel/Findley Award: Wayne Johnston

United Kingdom
Man Booker Prize: Julian Barnes, The Sense of an Ending
Caine Prize for African Writing: NoViolet Bulawayo, "Hitting Budapest"
David Cohen Prize: Julian Barnes
Orange Prize for Fiction: Téa Obreht, The Tiger's Wife

United States
Lambda Literary Awards: Multiple categories; see 2011 Lambda Literary Awards.
National Book Award for Fiction: to Salvage the Bones by Jesmyn Ward
National Book Critics Circle Award: to Binocular Vision: New and Selected Stories by Edith Pearlman
PEN/Faulkner Award for Fiction: to The Collected Stories of Deborah Eisenberg by Deborah Eisenberg
Pulitzer Prize for Fiction: Jennifer Egan, A Visit from the Goon Squad
Whiting Awards: Fiction: Scott Blackwood, Ryan Call, Daniel Orozco, Teddy Wayne; Nonfiction: Paul Clemens; Plays: Amy Herzog; Poetry: Don Mee Choi, Eduardo C. Corral, Shane McCrae, Kerri Webster

Other
Camões Prize: Manuel António Pina
Europe Theatre Prize: Peter Stein
European Book Prize: Maxim Leo, Red Love, and Anna Bikont, The Crime and the Silence
International Prize for Arabic Fiction: Mohammed Achaari, The Arch and the Butterfly, and Raja'a Alem, The Doves' Necklace
SAARC Literary Award: Ibrahim Waheed, Syed Akhtar Hussain Akhtar

See also
List of literary awards
List of poetry awards
2011 in comics
2011 in Australian literature

Notes

References

 
2011 books
Years of the 21st century in literature